Allah Marz or Laleh Marz may refer to:
 Allah Marz, Behshahr
 Allah Marz, Sari